This is a compilation of initialisms and acronyms commonly used in mass spectrometry.

A
 ADI – Ambient desorption ionization
 AE – Appearance energy
 AFADESI – Air flow-assisted desorption electrospray ionization
 AFAI –  Air flow-assisted ionization
 AFAPA – Aerosol flowing atmospheric-pressure afterglow
 AGHIS – All-glass heated inlet system
 AIRLAB – Ambient infrared laser ablation
 AMS – Accelerator mass spectrometry
 AMS – Aerosol mass spectrometer
 AMU – Atomic mass unit
 AP – Appearance potential
 AP MALDI – Atmospheric pressure matrix-assisted laser desorption/ionization
 APCI – Atmospheric pressure chemical ionization
 API – Atmospheric pressure ionization
 APPI – Atmospheric pressure photoionization
 ASAP – Atmospheric Sample Analysis Probe
 ASMS – American Society for Mass Spectrometry

B
 BP – Base peak
 BIRD – Blackbody infrared radiative dissociation

C
 CRF – Charge remote fragmentation
 CSR – Charge stripping reaction
 CI – Chemical ionization
 CA – Collisional activation
 CAD – Collisionally activated dissociation
 CID – Collision-induced dissociation
 CRM – Consecutive reaction monitoring
 CF-FAB – Continuous flow fast atom bombardment
 CRIMS – Chemical reaction interface mass spectrometry
 CTD – Charge transfer dissociation

D
 DE – Delayed extraction
 DADI – Direct analysis of daughter ions
 DAPPI – Desorption atmospheric pressure photoionization
 DEP – Direct exposure probe
 DESI – Desorption electrospray ionization
 DIOS – Desorption/ionization on silicon
 DIP – Direct insertion probe
 DART – Direct analysis in real time
 DLI – Direct liquid introduction
 DIA – Data independent acquisition

E
 EA – Electron affinity
 EAD – Electron-activated dissociation
 ECD – Electron-capture dissociation
 ECI – Electron capture ionization
 EDD – Electron-detachment dissociation
 EI – Electron ionization (or electron impact)
 EJMS – European Journal of Mass Spectrometry
 ESA – Electrostatic energy analyzer
 ES/ESI – Electrospray ionisation
 ETD – Electron-transfer dissociation
 eV – Electronvolt

F
 FAIMS – High-field asymmetric waveform ion mobility spectrometry
 FAB – Fast atom bombardment
 FIB – Fast ion bombardment
 FD – Field desorption
 FFR – Field-free region
 FI – Field ionization
 FT-ICR MS – Fourier transform ion cyclotron resonance mass spectrometer
 FTMS – Fourier transform mass spectrometer

G
 GDMS – Glow discharge mass spectrometry

H
 HDX – Hydrogen/deuterium exchange
HCD – Higher-energy C-trap dissociation

I
 ICAT – Isotope-coded affinity tag
 ICP – Inductively coupled plasma
 ICRMS – Ion cyclotron resonance mass spectrometer
 IDMS – Isotope dilution mass spectrometry
 IJMS – International Journal of Mass Spectrometry
 IRMPD – Infrared multiphoton dissociation
 IKES – Ion kinetic energy spectrometry
 IMS – Ion mobility spectrometry
 IMSC – International Mass Spectrometry Conference
 IMSF – International Mass Spectrometry Foundation
 IRMS – Isotope ratio mass spectrometry
 IT – Ion trap
 ITMS – Ion trap mass spectrometry
 ITMS – Ion trap mobility spectrometry
 iTRAQ – Isobaric tag for relative and absolute quantitation

J
 JASMS – Journal of the American Society for Mass Spectrometry
 JEOL – Japan Electro-Optics Laboratory
 JMS – Journal of Mass Spectrometry

K
 KER – Kinetic energy release
 KERD – Kinetic energy release distribution

L
 LCMS – Liquid chromatography–mass spectrometry
 LD – Laser desorption
 LDI – Laser desorption ionization
 LI – Laser ionization 
 LMMS – Laser microprobe mass spectrometry
 LIT – Linear ion trap
 LSI – Liquid secondary ionization
 LSII – Laserspray ionization inlet

M
 MIKES – Mass-analyzed ion kinetic energy spectrometry
 MS – Mass spectrometer
 MS – Mass spectrometry
 MS2 – Mass spectrometry/mass spectrometry, i.e. tandem mass spectrometry
 MS/MS – Mass spectrometry/mass spectrometry, i.e. tandem mass spectrometry
 MALDESI – Matrix-assisted laser desorption electrospray ionization
 MALDI – Matrix-assisted laser desorption/ionization
 MAII – Matrix-assisted inlet ionization
 MAIV – Matrix-assisted ionization vacuum
 MIMS – Membrane introduction mass spectrometry, membrane inlet mass spectrometry, membrane interface mass spectrometry
 MCP – Microchannel plate
 MSn – Multiple-stage mass spectrometry
 MCP – Microchannel plate
 MPI – Multiphoton ionization
 MRM – Multiple reaction monitoring

N
 NEMS-MS – Nanoelectromechanical systems mass spectrometry
 NETD – Negative electron-transfer dissociation
 NICI – Negative ion chemical ionization
 NRMS – Neutralization reionization mass spectrometry

O
 oa-TOF – Orthogonal acceleration time of flight
 OMS – Organic Mass Spectrometry (journal)

P
 PDI – Plasma desorption/ionization
 PDMS – Plasma desorption mass spectrometry
 PAD – Post-acceleration detector
 PSD – Post-source decay
 PyMS – Pyrolysis mass spectrometry

Q
 QUISTOR – Quadrupole ion storage trap
 QIT – Quadrupole ion trap
 QMS – Quadrupole mass spectrometer
 QTOF – Quadrupole time of flight

R
 RCM – Rapid Communications in Mass Spectrometry
 REIMS – Rapid evaporative ionization mass spectrometry
 REMPI – Resonance enhanced multiphoton ionization
 RGA – Residual gas analyzer
 RI – Resonance ionization

S
 SAII – Solvent-assisted ionization inlet
 SELDI – Surface-enhanced laser desorption/ionization
 SESI – Secondary electrospray ionization
 SHRIMP – Sensitive high-resolution ion microprobe
 SIFT – Selected ion flow tube
 SILAC – Stable isotope labelling by amino acids in cell culture
 SIM – Selected ion monitoring
 SIMS – Secondary ion mass spectrometry
 SIR – Selected ion recording
 SNMS – Secondary neutral mass spectrometry
 SRM – Selected reaction monitoring
 SWIFT – Stored waveform inverse Fourier transform
 SID – Surface-induced dissociation
 SIR – Surface-induced reaction
 SI – Surface ionization
 SORI – Sustained off-resonance irradiation

T
 TI – Thermal ionization
 TIC – Total ion current
 TICC – Total ion current chromatogram
 TLF – Time-lag focusing
 TMT – Tandem mass tags
 TOF-MS – Time-of-flight mass spectrometer

V
 VG – Vacuum Generators (company)

References

External links
 Mass Spectroscopy Acronym Page at MIT

Mass spectrometry
Mass spectrometry